Ogilvie is a city in Kanabec County, Minnesota, United States. The population was 369 at the 2010 census.

Geography

The Groundhouse River flows nearby.

Transportation

Major routes 
The following roads serve as major routes through the community of Ogilvie.

  Minnesota State Highway 23
  Minnesota State Highway 47
  Kanabec County Road 10

Demographics

2010 census
As of the census of 2010, there were 369 people, 160 households, and 91 families residing in the city. The racial makeup of the city was 98.9% White, 0.3% Native American, and 0.8% from two or more races. Hispanic or Latino of any race were 0.3% of the population.

There were 160 households, of which 27.5% had children under the age of 18 living with them, 33.8% were married couples living together, 16.9% had a female householder with no husband present, 6.3% had a male householder with no wife present, and 43.1% were non-families. 30.6% of all households were made up of individuals, and 16.9% had someone living alone who was 65 years of age or older. The average household size was 2.31 and the average family size was 2.89.

The median age in the city was 41.3 years. 24.4% of residents were under the age of 18; 6.1% were between the ages of 18 and 24; 22.3% were from 25 to 44; 28.4% were from 45 to 64; and 18.7% were 65 years of age or older. The gender makeup of the city was 49.6% male and 50.4% female.

2000 census
As of the census of 2000, there were 474 people, 182 households, and 111 families residing in the city. The racial makeup of the city was 93.88% White, 0.42% African American, 2.11% Native American, 2.74% Asian, 0.21% from other races, and 0.63% from two or more races. Hispanic or Latino of any race were 0.63% of the population.

There were 182 households, out of which 39.0% had children under the age of 18 living with them, 37.9% were married couples living together, 15.9% had a female householder with no husband present, and 38.5% were non-families. 30.2% of all households were made up of individuals, and 13.2% had someone living alone who was 65 years of age or older.  The average household size was 2.60 and the average family size was 3.13.

In the city, the population was spread out, with 32.3% under the age of 18, 8.0% from 18 to 24, 27.8% from 25 to 44, 19.4% from 45 to 64, and 12.4% who were 65 years of age or older.  The median age was 32 years. For every 100 females, there were 89.6 males.  For every 100 females age 18 and over, there were 86.6 males.

The median income in 2000 for a household in the city was $27,292, and the median income for a family was $33,125. Males had a median income of $22,083 versus $21,250 for females. The per capita income for the city was $15,198.  About 8.8% of families and 14.6% of the population were below the poverty line, including 20.0% of those under age 18 and 6.7% of those age 65 or over.

History

A post office called Ogilvie has been in operation since 1899. The city was named for Oric Ogilvie Whited, a local landowner.

Today
The Ogilvie Raceway, a  3/8 mile Dirt clay oval race track, opened on May 29, 2009. 

The sports teams at Ogilvie High School are known as the Ogilvie Lions.

Notable person
Clayton Tonnemaker (1928–1996), American football player

References

Cities in Kanabec County, Minnesota
Cities in Minnesota